Grøn Koncert (literally "Green Concert") is an annually recurring series of Danish one-day music festivals. Taking place in July, the concerts are performed by a selection of bands who tour around Denmark for about ten days. The concerts have been held every year since 1983, always with mostly or exclusively Danish artists.

The concerts are arranged by Muskelsvindfonden, a Danish support organisation for muscular dystrophy sufferers; the practical work for the concerts is done by several hundred people from "Det Grønne Crew", Muskelsvindfonden's concert volunteer group. The main sponsor is Tuborg.

List of concerts

References

External links 
 www.groenkoncert.dk (Danish)
 www.crewet.dk (Danish)
 www.muskelsvindfonden.dk (Danish)

Music festivals in Denmark
Festivals established in 1983
Summer events in Denmark
1983 establishments in Denmark